Still Fresh (born in 1993) is a French rapper from the 20th arrondissement of Paris. He is signed with Sony Music since 2010.

He started early encouraged by music managers and producers Xavier and Moblack. He was featured in a number of tracks on the compilation hip hop album À la Fuck You including a collaboration with Mister You in "Sur le terrain" featuring Bilel, DI & Still Fresh. He released his first album in 2011 titled Mes rêves followed by Marche ou rêve in 2013. In 2012, he released a mixtape N.E in collaboration with S.Pri Noir.

Discography

Mixtapes
Fresh Tape (Mixtape)
N.E (crediting S.Pri Noir & Still Fresh) (2012)

References

External links
Facebook

French rappers
1994 births
Living people